Felons for Life is a compilation album by American nu metal band Dope. It is a compilation of previously released material, demo recordings, and live versions of songs. It was self-released (though it lists "Eat Me/Sue Me" as the record label) in October 2002.

The first 18 tracks are album versions and alternate versions of tracks from the band's first two albums, Felons and Revolutionaries and Life (except for track three, which is a demo version of a song from the 2003 album Group Therapy). The last four tracks are from the band's 1998 Felons demo.

Felons for Life was only available at live performances and through the band's website.

Track listing

Personnel

 Edsel Dope – lead vocals, rhythm guitar
 Virus – lead guitar, backing vocals
 Sloane "Mosey" Jentry – bass
 Simon Dope – sampler, keyboards, percussion
 Racci "Sketchy" Shay – drums

References

Dope (band) albums
2002 compilation albums